The Amsterdam Tournament  is a pre-season football tournament held for club teams from around the world, hosted at the Amsterdam ArenA. The 2000 tournament was contested by Ajax, Arsenal, Barcelona and Lazio on 3 August and 5 August 2000. Barcelona won the tournament.

Table

Matches

Day 1

Day 2

References
rsssf.com

2000 
2000–01 in Dutch football
2000–01 in Italian football
2000–01 in Spanish football
2000–01 in English football